Matigramma is a genus of moths in the family Erebidae. The genus was erected by Augustus Radcliffe Grote in 1872.

Species
Matigramma aderces Franclemont, 1986 Mexico
Matigramma adoceta Franclemont, 1986 Arizona
Matigramma emmilta Franclemont, 1986 Arizona, western Texas
Matigramma inopinata Franclemont, 1986 Texas, Arizona
Matigramma necopina Franclemont, 1986 Mexico
Matigramma obscurior Frnaclemont & Todd, 1983 Texas
Matigramma pulverilinea Grote, 1872 Florida - Texas, southern Kansas, southern Missouri – dusty-lined matigramma moth
Matigramma repentina Franclemont, 1986 Arizona, Mexico
Matigramma rubrosuffusa Grote, 1882 Arizona, Texas, Mexico

Former species
Matigramma metaleuca is now Acritogramma metaleuca (Hampson, 1913)

References

Omopterini
Moth genera